Robert Lahiffe (9 March 1909 – 8 March 1975) was an Irish Fianna Fáil politician and farmer. He served in the Oireachtas for 7 years as a Teachta Dála (TD), and then as a Senator for 8 years.

Lahiffe was born in the townland of Cloone, Gort, County Galway, the son of James N. Lahiff and Maria Quinn.

Lahiffe was elected to Dáil Éireann at the 1948 general election as a Fianna Fáil TD for the Galway South constituency. He was defeated at the 1951 general election by Fine Gael's Patrick Cawley, but two years later was re-elected at a by-election in August 1953 following the death of Frank Fahy, a Fianna Fáil TD who as Ceann Comhairle had been returned unopposed in 1951. Lahiffe held the seat at the general election in 1954, but was ousted again at the 1957 general election. Fianna Fáil had run three candidates in three-seat constituency, and Lahiffe was beaten by his first-time running-mate Michael Carty.

He was then elected to the 9th Seanad by the Agricultural Panel, which re-elected him in 1961. However, he was defeated at the 1965 election to the 11th Seanad.

References

1909 births
1975 deaths
Fianna Fáil TDs
Members of the 13th Dáil
Members of the 14th Dáil
Members of the 15th Dáil
Members of the 9th Seanad
Members of the 10th Seanad
Irish farmers
Politicians from County Galway
Fianna Fáil senators